is a Japanese actor and film director based in Indonesia and in Tokyo, Japan.

Filmography
Untuk Rena (2005)
Naga Bonar Jadi 2 (2007)
Cinta Setaman (2008)
Rumah Maida (2009)
Hati Merdeka (2011)
Soegija (2012)
Sang Kiai (2013)
Soekarno (2013)
12 Menit Untuk Selamanya (2014)
Battle of Surabaya (2015)

TV series
Kelas Internasional (2015)

References

External links

Living people
Japanese male actors
Japanese film directors
Japanese expatriates in Indonesia
Year of birth missing (living people)